Janine Wegman (born Marinus Johannes Wegman, 25 September 1925 – 22 February 2007) was a Rotterdam Hammond-organist and artist. She was one of the first Dutch people to be openly transsexual.

Career 
Wegman started her career as the magician ‘Rinus’, and later had success with her first wife with the act 'Marinio en Janine', and appeared on national television in 1949. She worked at the volunteer fire service. Later in life she became a Hammond-organist. She regularly performed in Rotterdam, and in the early 1970s she played on Wednesday and Saturday afternoon on the Schouwburgplein.

Personal life 
Wegman was born in Rotterdam. She has been married twice and had two children. She chose the name Janine after the first name of her first wife. In 1978 she put a personal ad in the newspaper with the text 'Which man or woman will take a woman with a small mistake on a holiday for free?' Jan van Vriesland responded and took her on her first foreign trip to Spain. The couple married during this trip in Barcelona, but this marriage was not officially recognized in the Netherlands. In 1992 she appeared in the television program .

Transgender-emancipation 
Wegman was born as an androgynous person, and felt like a woman since 1960. Janine was known as the first transsexual person in Rotterdam to present in public as a woman in the late 1950s. Together with trans pioneers such as Aaïcha Bergamin, she was one of the first people in the Netherlands to openly manifest herself as transsexual. She was being treated by Dr Otto de Vaal and received hormone tablets.

Since 1959 there was a General Police Regulation in Rotterdam in which Article 56, “Walking in disguise or masked”, was used to prevent transvestism. Section 1 read: "It is forbidden to show oneself on the road in the clothing of the sex to which one does not belong." Wegman was regularly arrested by the police for walking down the street in women's clothing. She had a run-in with the police after hitting a police officer in the face in the Benthuizerstraat, after which six police officers beat her up until she bled.

She had to try for several years before she could become a member of the COC, a Dutch organisation for LGBT people.

In 1978 Wegman managed to change the name in her passport to Johanna Maria Wegman through a lawsuit. In an attempt to get the V for Female in her passport, she showed her breasts several times at City Hall. After the first action in 1978, a civil registry officer scratched the V for Female in her passport, but this was not a legally valid change. After her second action in 1995, the registry office stated that there were no valid documents of gender reassignment, which was a prerequisite for gender reassignment on ID cards between 1985 and 2014. In 1996, after being castrated, and again appearing bare-chested at the counter  and threatening with suicide, Janine Wegman was finally allowed to register as a woman at the registry office.

References 

1925 births
2007 deaths
Dutch organists
20th-century Dutch women artists
Transgender artists
Transgender women
Dutch LGBT artists
Dutch transgender people
Artists from Rotterdam